The Lie of Nina Petrovna (French: Le mensonge de Nina Petrovna) is a 1937 French drama film directed by Viktor Tourjansky and starring Isa Miranda, Fernand Gravey and Aimé Clariond. It is a remake of the 1929 silent film The Wonderful Lies of Nina Petrovna with the setting moved from the Russian Empire to Imperial Vienna. The film's sets were designed by the art director Guy de Gastyne.

Synopsis
A beautiful Russian woman in Vienna becomes the mistress of the powerful Baron Engern. However, she meets and falls in love with a young army officer. She is prepared to give up everything for him, but knowing that the Baron will ruin his career, she is forced to leave him and return to her former lover.

Partial cast
 Isa Miranda as Nina Petrovna 
 Fernand Gravey as Lieutenant Franz Korff 
 Aimé Clariond as Baron Engern 
 Annie Vernay as Lisl 
 Gabrielle Dorziat as Baroness Engern 
 Paulette Dubost as Lotte  
 Roland Toutain as Tony 
 Raymond Galle as L'avocat  
 Paul Ollivier as Le général 
 Raymond Aimos as Le berger  
 René Dary as Boris  
 Roger Legris as Pierre  
 Pierre Magnier as L'oncle 
 Jean Rousselière as L'officier français

References

Bibliography 
 Gundle, Stephen. Mussolini's Dream Factory: Film Stardom in Fascist Italy. Berghahn Books, 2013.

External links 
 

1937 films
French drama films
French black-and-white films
1937 drama films
1930s French-language films
Films directed by Victor Tourjansky
Films scored by Michel Michelet
Films set in the 1910s
Films set in Vienna
Remakes of German films
Films with screenplays by Hans Székely
1930s French films